The opening ceremony of the 2010 Winter Paralympics, or the X Paralympic Games were held on March 12, 2010 beginning at 6:00 pm PST (02:00 UTC, March 13) at the BC Place Stadium in Vancouver, British Columbia, Canada. The opening ceremony's theme was "One Inspires Many", and featured over 5000 local performers. The 2 hour long ceremony was produced by Vancouver-based Patrick Roberge Productions Inc

The event was officially opened by Governor General Michaëlle Jean,  representative of Elizabeth II, Queen of Canada.

Programme

National anthem 
Canada's national anthem, "O Canada", was performed by singer Terry Kelly, a blind former Paralympian.  Mari Klassen signed the anthem in American Sign Language (ASL). Hundreds of children stood in the shape of a maple leaf in a formation.

Parade of the Nations

The participating countries entered in alphabetical order of their country names in English, except for host nation, Canada, entering last.  Canada has the greatest number of athletes with 55.

Artistic section
Luca Patuelli
Dal Richards and his orchestra, and Michael Kaeshammer Joined by trumpet player Bria Skonberg and saxophonist Evan Arntzen.
Martin Deschamps
Fefe Dobson performed the songs "I Want You" and "Watch Me Move". Aaron "Wheelz" Fotheringham, Nikki Yanofsky and others performed.

Entry of the Paralympic Flag
The flag was carried into the stadium. It was then transferred to members of the Canadian Forces' Soldier On program: Sgt. Karen McCoy, and Master Cpl. Mike Trauner, who then raised the flag.

Paralympic Oaths
Canadian ice sledge hockey player Herve Lord took the athlete's oath as a representative of each of the participating Paralympic competitors. Canadian curling official Linda Kirton took the official's oath on behalf of each officiating Paralympic referee or other official.

Lighting of the Cauldron
The final torch bearer was 15-year-old snowboarder Zach Beaumont, who is an amputee.

Dignitaries and other officials in attendance

 Michaëlle Jean, Governor General of Canada
 Jean-Daniel Lafond, Viceregal consort of Canada
 Stephen Harper, Prime Minister of Canada
 Gordon Campbell, Premier of British Columbia, and his wife Nancy Campbell
 Sam Sullivan, Canada's Paralympic Ambassador, former Mayor of Vancouver
 Sir Philip Craven, President of the International Paralympic Committee
 Jacques Rogge, President of the International Olympic Committee

Media coverage
Live broadcast:
: CTV Vancouver
: SBS
: TVE
: France 2
: Sky Sport
: SVT

The ceremony was aired live on ParalympicSport.TV, and approximately two hours after it ended, it became available as Video on Demand (VOD).

Delayed coverage:
: RTR
: NRK
: NTU
: CTV (full coverage)
: NBC
: ABC

Originally, the host nation's TV broadcaster, CTV, did not plan to air the opening ceremony live. After receiving criticism on the decision, CTV changed its mind and decided to air the ceremony live in Vancouver region. But regions outside of Vancouver continued to air the ceremony tape delayed.

See also
2010 Winter Olympics opening ceremony

References

External links

Official Website of the 2010 Winter Olympic and Paralympic Games
Paralympic Sport TV, web-TV channel of the International Paralympic Committee (IPC)

Ceremony Opening
Paralympics opening ceremonies
Ceremonies in Canada